Mark Jeffrey Zembsch (born February 19, 1959) is an American rowing coxswain. He competed in the men's coxed four event at the 1988 Summer Olympics.

References

External links
 

1959 births
Living people
American male rowers
Olympic rowers of the United States
Rowers at the 1988 Summer Olympics
People from Castro Valley, California
Sportspeople from Castro Valley, California